Vilas may refer to:

People
Last name
Vilas Nande (fl.2000), musician
 Charles Nathaniel Vilas (died 1931), American philanthropist in New Hampshire for whom the Vilas Bridge was named
Dane Vilas (born 1985), South African cricketer
Faith Vilas (born 1952), American planetary scientist
Guillermo Vilas (born 1952), Argentine tennis player
Joseph Vilas (1832–1905), American politician in Wisconsin, cousin of William Freeman Vilas
Levi Baker Vilas (1811–1879), American politician in Wisconsin, father of William Freeman Vilas
Logan Archbold Vilas (1891–1976), American aviator
Manuel Vilas, Spanish writer
Margaret Van Pelt Vilas  (1905–1995), American architect
Mari Paz Vilas (born 1988), Spanish footballer
María Vilas (born 1996), Spanish swimmer
Martin S. Vilas (1870–1953), American lawyer, politician and author in Vermont
William Frederick Vilas (1853–1930), Canadian politician in Quebec
William Freeman Vilas (1840–1908), American politician in Wisconsin, son of Levi Baker Vilas
Xosé Neira Vilas (1928–2015), Galician writer

First name
Vilas Ghogre (1947–1997), Indian activist, poet, and artist
Vilas Muttemwar (born 1949), Indian politician
Vilas Potnis, Indian politician
Vilas Rupawate (born 1967), Indian politician
Vilas Adinath Sangave (1920–2011), Indian sociologist and Jainologist
Vilas Sarang (1942–2015), Indian writer, critic and translator
Vilas Sawant, Indian politician
Vilas Tare, Indian politician

Middle name
André Vilas Boas (born 1983), Portuguese footballer
Ram Vilas Paswan (1946–2020), Indian politician
Ram Vilas Sharma (1912–2000), Indian literary critic, linguist, poet and thinker
Charles V. Truax (1887–1935), American politician in Ohio
Ram Vilas Vedanti (born 1958), Indian politician and Hindu religious leader

Places

Communities

Portugal
Towns in Portugal, as vilas means "villages" in Portuguese, may refer specifically to:
 Vilas (Boticas), a civil parish in the municipality of Boticas

United States
Vilas, Colorado, a statutory town in Baca County
Vilas, Florida, an unincorporated community in Liberty County
Vilas, Indiana, an unincorporated community in Franklin Township, Owen County
Vilas, Kansas, an unincorporated community in Wilson County
Vilas, North Carolina, an unincorporated community in Watauga County
Vilas, South Dakota, a town in Miner County
Vilas, Texas, an unincorporated community in Bell County
Vilas, Wisconsin, a town in Langlade County
Vilas (community), Dane County, Wisconsin, an unincorporated community located in the town of Cottage Grove
Vilas County, Wisconsin

Landmarks and historic places

India
 Jai Vilas Mahal, a nineteenth century palace in Gwalior
 Jayalakshmi Vilas, a heritage building in Mysore, Karnataka
 Lakshmi Vilas Palace, Vadodara, in Vadodara, Gujarat
 Rajendra Vilas, a palace-hotel atop Chamundi Hills in Mysore, Karnataka
 Vijaya Vilas Palace, in the town of Mandvi in the Kutch district of Gujarat

United States
 Henry Vilas Zoo, in Madison, Wisconsin, United States
 S. F. Vilas Home for Aged & Infirmed Ladies, in Clinton County, New York
 Vilas Bridge, over the Connecticut River between Vermont and New Hampshire
 Vilas Circle Bear Effigy Mound and the Curtis Mounds, in Madison, Wisconsin
 Vilas Park Mound Group, in Madison, Wisconsin
 Vilas Shale, a geologic formation in Kansas

Other uses
 Bharatha Vilas, a 1973 Indian Tamil-language film
 Dalpat Vilas, a fragment of a historical manuscript written in the Rajasthani language
 Lakshmi Vilas Bank, an Indian bank from 1926 to 2020
 Ram Vilas Ganga Ram College, in Maharajganj, Siwan, Bihar, India
 Ranga Vilas, a 2013 Indian soap opera
 Sarada Vilas College, in Mysore, Karnataka, India

See also
Bilas (disambiguation)
Vila (disambiguation)
Villas (disambiguation)